Caltagirone Editore S.p.A. is an Italian publisher, based in Rome, Italy, founded in July 1999 (following the purchase of the newspapers Il Messaggero and Il Mattino in 1999). Francesco Gaetano Caltagirone is the founder of the company which has been listed on the Italian Stock Exchange since December 2000.

Shareholding
 Francesco Gaetano Caltagirone - 65.590%
 Francesco Gaetano Caltagirone - 18%
 Parted 1982 S.p.A. - 35.564%
 Caltagirone Editore - 0.025%
 Gamma Immobiliare S.r.l. - 12.001%
 Gaetano Caltagirone (nephew of Francesco Gaetano Caltagirone) - 2.399%
 Edizione Holding - 2.239%

Overview 
 Newspapers
 Il Messaggero
 Il Mattino
 Il Gazzettino
 Leggo
 Corriere Adriatico
 Nuovo Quotidiano di Puglia
 Television
 TeleFriuli
 Advertising
 Piemme concessionaria di pubblicità
 Web portal
 Caltanet.it

References

External links
 Corporate Website 

Italian companies established in 1999
Companies based in Rome
Television networks in Italy
Mass media in Rome
Newspaper companies of Italy
Publishing companies established in 1999
Publishing companies of Italy